Climacoptera may refer to:
 Climacoptera (katydid), a genus of katydids in the family Tettigoniidae
 Climacoptera (plant), a genus of flowering plants in the family Amaranthaceae